The Santa Monica Courthouse is a government building in Santa Monica, California, in the United States.

References

External links 

 Santa Monica Courthouse, Superior Court of California, County of Los Angeles

Buildings and structures in Santa Monica, California
Government buildings in California